Tha Mai is a tambon (subdistrict) of Tha Maka District, in Kanchanaburi Province, Thailand. In 2017 it had a total population of 9,411 people.

References

External links
Thaitambon.com on Si

Tambon of Kanchanaburi Province
Populated places in Kanchanaburi province